The 1970 Tennessee gubernatorial election was held on November 3, 1970. Republican Winfield Dunn, defeated Democratic nominee John Jay Hooker with 52.0% of the vote. Dunn became the first Republican Governor of Tennessee in fifty years.

Primary elections
Primary elections were held on August 6, 1970.

Democratic primary

Candidates
John Jay Hooker, perennial candidate
Stan Snodgrass
Robert L. Taylor
Mary Anderson
Ralph W. Emerson 	
James A. Newton

Results

Republican primary

Candidates
Winfield Dunn, former chairman of the Shelby County Republican Party
Maxey Jarman
Bill Jenkins, former Speaker of the Tennessee House of Representatives
Claude Robertson
Hubert David Patty, perennial candidate

Results

General election

Candidates
Major party candidates
Winfield Dunn, Republican 
John Jay Hooker, Democratic

Other candidates
Douglas L. Heinsohn, American

Results

References

1970
Tennessee
Gubernatorial
November 1970 events in the United States